Thomas Woods (born 1972) is an American historian and author.

Thomas, Tom or Tommy Woods may also refer to:

Sports
Tom Woods (high jumper) (born 1953), American high jumper
Tom Woods (American football) (1896–?), American football player
Tom Woods (rugby union), Canadian rugby player
Tommy Woods (baseball), Negro leagues baseball player
Tommy Woods (basketball) (born 1943), American professional basketball player
Tommy Woods (rugby) (1883–1955), English rugby union and rugby league footballer who played in the 1900s and 1910s for England (RU), Great Britain (RL), and England (RL)
Thomas Woods (rugby) (1890–?), rugby union and rugby league footballer who played in the 1920s for England (RU), and Wales (RL)
Thomas Syme (Thomas Woods Syme, 1928–2011), British ice hockey player

Politics
Tom Woods (California politician) (born 1947), member of the California State Assembly 1994–1998
Tom Woods (Montana politician) (born 1961), member of the Montana House of Representatives
Tom Woods (Oklahoma politician), member of the Oklahoma Senate
Tommy Woods (politician) (1933–2020), American politician in the Mississippi House of Representatives
Thomas H. Woods (1836–1910), American politician and judge in Mississippi
Thomas Woods (Irish diplomat) (1923–1961), Irish writer and politician

See also
Thomas Wood (disambiguation)